4th SFFCC Awards
December 12, 2005

Best Picture: 
 Brokeback Mountain 
The 4th San Francisco Film Critics Circle Awards, honoring the best in film for 2005, were given on 12 December 2005.

Winners

Best Picture:
Brokeback Mountain
Best Director:
Ang Lee - Brokeback Mountain
Best Screenplay:
Good Night, and Good Luck. - George Clooney and Grant Heslov
Best Actor:
Heath Ledger - Brokeback Mountain
Best Actress:
Reese Witherspoon - Walk the Line
Best Supporting Actor:
Kevin Costner - The Upside of Anger
Best Supporting Actress:
Amy Adams - Junebug
Best Foreign Language Film:
Caché • France/Austria/Germany/Italy/United States
Best Documentary:
Grizzly Man
Marlon Riggs Award (for courage & vision in the Bay Area film community):
Jenni Olson - The Joy of Life

External links
 2005 San Francisco Film Critics Circle Awards

References
 'Brokeback' is top film pick of S.F. critics

San Francisco Film Critics Circle Awards
2005 film awards
2005 in San Francisco